Coon Hill is a mountain located in the Catskill Mountains of New York north of Hancock. Hawk Mountain is located east, Jehu Mountain is located southeast, and Point Mountain is located south of Coon Hill.

References

Mountains of Delaware County, New York
Mountains of New York (state)